Atrophaneura priapus, the Priapus batwing or white-head batwing, is a swallowtail butterfly found in Burma, Malaysia, Sumatra, and Java. The subspecies A. p. hageni was named to honour Hermann August Hagen. It may be a full species.

A. priapus is a large butterfly (11–14 cm wingspan). The forewings are black with the wing veins bordered by white. The hindwings are black and have a wavy margin. There is a broad, slightly yellowish white band on the hindwing. This band contains large black spots. In males there is a white area with red edge next to the body. The underside is similar to the upperside, but the white area is missing. The abdomen is yellow and black above. The head (hence the common name white-head batwing) and the underside of abdomen are white or yellow. The thorax is black.

Subspecies
Atrophaneura priapus priapus west Java
Atrophaneura priapus dilutus (Fruhstorfer, 1895) east Java
Atrophaneura priapus hageni (Rogenhofer, 1889) Sumatra, Indonesia

Biology
Atrophaneura priapus is a Troides mimic and is, itself mimicked by females of Papilio forbesi.

Taxonomy
Atrophaneura priapus, A. priapus hageni and A. sycorax, are often confused and may represent one, two or three good species although the hindwing pouches and androconial scales are variously modified.

Status
It is not known to be threatened, though the status is uncertain.

References

External links
Butterflycorner Images from Naturhistorisches Museum Wien
Global Butterfly Information System text and images including holotype (access via "tree" left)

Atrophaneura
Butterflies of Indonesia
Taxa named by Jean Baptiste Boisduval
Butterflies described in 1836